Eitzing is a municipality in the district of Ried im Innkreis in the Austrian state of Upper Austria.

Geography
Eitzing is situated 419 m above sea level in the Innviertel. Its dimensions are 4,6 km from the North to the South and 4,3 km from the West to the East. The complete area accounts for 8,62 km². 13,8% of the land is afforested, 77% is used agriculturally. Parts of the municipality are Amerika, Bankham, Ertlberg, Hofing, Kirchberg, Obereitzing, Probenzing, Sausack, Untereitzing, Ursprung and Wöppelhub.

Population

References

Cities and towns in Ried im Innkreis District